An acorn is the nut of an oak tree.

Acorn or ACORN may also refer to:

Computing
 Acorn (software), a graphic editor for macOS
 Acorn Computers (1978–1998), a manufacturer of computers
 Acorn, the development code name for the IBM 5150 PC.
 Acorn Computers (2006), a manufacturer of Windows-only computers
 ACORN-NS, the Atlantic Canada Organization of Research Networks - Nova Scotia, computer network

Mathematics
 ACORN (PRNG), a robust pseudorandom number generator (PRNG) introduced by R.S.Wikramaratna in 1989

Companies and organizations
 ACORN International, a federation of community-based activist organisations, see also Association of Community Organizations for Reform Now
 Acorn DVD, a home media publisher and distributor
 Acorn Energy, a company investing in electricity and security
 Acorn Records, American record label created in 1950
 Acorn Stores, a clothing retail company
 Acorn TV, an American subscription streaming service
 Acorns (company), an American financial technology and financial services company that specializes in micro-investing and robo advice

People
 John Acorn (active 2000s), Canadian naturalist
 Milton Acorn (1923–1986), Canadian poet
 Earnie Shavers (born 1944), an American former boxer who was nicknamed "The Acorn"

Places
 Acorn, Arkansas
 Acorn, Oakland, California, a housing complex
 Acorn Community, Virginia
 Acorn, Virginia

Other
 Acorn (demographics), a geodemographic classification system
 Acorn nut, a domed connecting piece
 Acorn squash
 Acute Care of at-Risk Newborns (ACoRN), a Canadian neonatal resuscitation program

See also
 Acorns (disambiguation)
 The Acorn (disambiguation)